Rétalap is a village in Győr-Moson-Sopron County, Hungary.

References

External links
Official website 

Populated places in Győr-Moson-Sopron County